{{Speciesbox
| image =
| image_caption =
| taxon = Hirtotyphis trispinosus
| authority = Houart, 1991
| synonyms_ref =
| synonyms = 
 Typhis (Hirtotyphis) trispinosus'' (Houart, 1991) 
 Typhis trispinosus (Houart, 1991) ·
}}Hirtotyphis trispinosus'' is a species of sea snail, a marine gastropod mollusk in the family Muricidae, the murex snails or rock snails.

Description

Distribution

References

 Houart, R, Buge, B. & Zuccon, D. (2021). A taxonomic update of the Typhinae (Gastropoda: Muricidae) with a review of New Caledonia species and the description of new species from New Caledonia, the South China Sea and Western Australia. Journal of Conchology. 44(2): 103–147.

External links
 Houart, R. (1991). Description of thirteen new species of Muricidae (Gastropoda) from Australia and the New Caledonian region, with range extensions to South Africa. Journal of the Malacological Society of Australia. 12: 35-55

Gastropods described in 1991
Typhinae